The Victorian Internet: The Remarkable Story of the Telegraph and the Nineteenth Century's On-Line Pioneers is a 1998 book by Tom Standage. The book was first published in September 1998 through Walker & Company and discusses the development and uses of the electric telegraph during the second half of the 19th century and some of the similarities the telegraph shared with the Internet of the late 20th century.

The central idea of the book posits that of these two technologies, it was the telegraph that was the more significant, since the ability to communicate globally at all in real-time was a qualitative shift, while the change brought on by the modern Internet was merely a quantitative shift according to Standage, though, by the same token, global communication was just a quantitative shift from long-distance communication.

Contents 
The book describes to general readers how some of the uses of telegraph in commercial, military, and social communication were, in a sense, analogous to modern uses of the internet. A few rather unusual stories are related, about couples who fell in love and even married over the wires, criminals who were caught through the telegraph, and so on.

The culture which developed between telegraph operators also had some rather unexpected affinities with the modern Internet. Both cultures made or make use of complex text coding and abbreviated language slang, both required network security experts, and both attracted criminals who used the networks to commit fraud, hack private communications, and send unwanted messages.

Reception
Critical reception of the book was mostly positive. Smithsonian magazine gave a positive review for The Victorian Internet, but stated that it was "not the book for readers who want in-depth accounts of the lives of scientist-inventors like Thomas Edison or Charles Wheatstone, detailed financial histories of companies like Western Union, or technical treatments of subjects like the development of semaphore systems and undersea cables". The Los Angeles Times had some criticisms of the book but gave a mostly positive review.

References

External links 

Technology books
Books about the Internet
1998 non-fiction books
History of the telegraph
Works about the information economy